On the 13th Day is the 17th studio album from the rock group Magnum (including Keeping the Nite Light Burning and ignoring Evolution), which was released in September 2012, under the label of Steamhammer Records/SPV. The cover artwork was painted by Rodney Matthews.

The album entered the charts at number 3 in the UK Rock & Metal Charts, number 5 in the UK Indie Charts, number 28 in the German Album Charts, #36 Swedish Album Charts, #43 UK Album Charts during its first week, making it their most successful album since their reformation in 2002 at the time of its release. The song "Let It Rain" was released as the first single from the album.

Bob Catley has stated that he considers On the 13th Day to be Magnum's rockiest album to date, with the track Dance of the Black Tattoo possibly classifying as a heavy metal song.

Track listing

Bonus disc 2

Personnel
Magnum
Tony Clarkin — guitar
Bob Catley — vocals
Al Barrow — bass guitar
Mark Stanway — keyboards
Harry James — drums

Additional musicians
Sue Parkes, Dan Clark, Susanna Westwood, Tony Nicholl, Mark Carlton, Stacey Green, Kay Savannah, Debby Alexander, Mark Tonks, Katy Jane G. — Choir on "From Within"
Dan Clark — brass on "See How They Fall"

References

2012 albums
Magnum (band) albums
SPV GmbH albums
Albums with cover art by Rodney Matthews